Lowell Holden Parker was an American attorney, banker and manufacturer from Beloit, Wisconsin who served a single term as a Republican member of the Wisconsin State Assembly in 1899. His father, Charles H. Parker, had held the same Assembly seat, first as a Republican, but later as a Greenback.

Born in Belvidere, Illinois, on November 30, 1848, Parker went to Beloit College and then graduated from the University of Michigan in 1875. He practiced law in Beloit, Wisconsin. Park served on the Beloit School Board. He was involved with manufacturing of harvesters and binders. He was also in the banking business. Parker died on December 12, 1937, in San Francisco, California at age 89.

References

American bankers
Businesspeople from Wisconsin
People from Belvidere, Illinois
Politicians from Beloit, Wisconsin
Beloit College alumni
University of Michigan alumni
Businesspeople from Michigan
Wisconsin lawyers
School board members in Wisconsin
1848 births
1937 deaths
Republican Party members of the Wisconsin State Assembly